The 2008 Leeward Islands Junior Championships in Athletics took place on June 28–29, 2008.  The event was held in Road Town, Tortola, British Virgin Islands.  Reports and photos were published.

A total of 47 events were contested, 24 by boys and 23 by girls.

Medal summary
Complete results can be found on the Nevis Amateur Athletic Association webpage.

Boys (U-20)

†: Open event for both U20 and U17 athletes.

Girls (U-20)

†: Open event for both U20 and U17 athletes.

Boys (U-17)

Girls (U-17)

Medal table (unofficial)

Team trophies
The scores for the team trophy were published.

Participation
According to an unofficial count, 102 athletes from 7 countries participated.

 (6)
 (8)
 (27)
 (4)
 (19)
 (27)
 (11)

References

2008
Leeward Islands Junior Championships in Athletics
Leeward Islands Junior Championships in Athletics
2008 in youth sport